James Frankfort (1930-2005), working as JAF was a cartoonist for The Village Voice. Frankfort was born in Belgium, served in the Korean War, and was a professor at New Paltz University.

Works
Cartoons, 1967

References

The Village Voice people
American cartoonists
American people of Belgian descent
1930 births
2005 deaths